Witiko is an ancient given name.

Witiko of Prčice (1120–1194) 
Witiko of Příběnice (died before 1259)
Witiko of Prčice and Blankenberg (around 1170–1256)
Witiko I. of Neuhaus (around 1223–1259)
Witiko I. of Krumau (around 1220–1277)
Witiko VI. of Rosenberg (died 1277)
Witiko II. of Krumau (died 1290)

See also
Vitek (disambiguation)
Witiko (novel)
Witigo